Shahin Huseinbala oglu Allahyarov was an Azerbaijani military officer.

Early life 
Shahin Allahyarov was born on 29 January 1993, in Phashali, Shamakhi District of the Azerbaijan. He has been living in Guba region since 1995.

Military service 
Shahin Allahyarov took part in the 2020 Nagorno-Karabakh war, which started on 27 September. Participating in the Aras Valley campaign, he fought in the offensives in Jabrayil, and Fuzuli. Shahin Allahyarov was shot on November 1, 2020 during a combat mission in Shusha between Armenian and Azerbaijani servicemen.

Awards 
 Allahyarov was awarded the title of the Hero of the Patriotic War on 9 December 2020, by the decree of the President Aliyev.
 Allahyarov was awarded the For Fatherland Medal for the second time on 15 December 2020, by the decree of the President Aliyev.
 Allahyarov was awarded the For the Liberation of Shusha Medal on 29 December 2020, by the decree of the President Aliyev.

References 

1993 births
2020 deaths
People from Shamakhi District
Heroes of the Patriotic War
People killed in the 2020 Nagorno-Karabakh war
Azerbaijani Land Forces personnel of the 2020 Nagorno-Karabakh war